Bolesław Surałło (1906 – 9 September 1939) was a Polish painter. His work was part of the painting event in the art competition at the 1928 Summer Olympics.

References

External links
 

1906 births
1939 deaths
20th-century Polish painters
20th-century Polish male artists
Olympic competitors in art competitions
Artists from Kherson
Polish male painters
Polish civilians killed in World War II